Masao Yamada (Shinjitai: 山田 政夫, born 7 May 1951 – 12 July 1998 ) was a Japanese racing driver.

Racing record

Complete Formula Nippon results 
(key) (Races in bold indicate pole position) (Races in italics indicate fastest lap)

References 

1951 births
1998 deaths
Japanese racing drivers
Japanese Formula 3 Championship drivers
Formula Nippon drivers